New Home Township may refer to:

New Home Township, Bates County, Missouri
New Home Township, Williams County, North Dakota, in Williams County, North Dakota

Township name disambiguation pages